Timur Rashiduly Bayzhanov (born 30 March 1990) is a Kazakh footballer who plays as a forward for Aksu.

Career statistics

International

References

External links

1990 births
Living people
Kazakhstani footballers
Kazakhstan international footballers
Kazakhstan Premier League players
FC Irtysh Pavlodar players
FC Kaisar players
FC Kairat players
FC Taraz players
FC Tyumen players
Kazakhstani expatriate footballers
Expatriate footballers in Russia
Association football forwards
People from Pavlodar